Mohkhuti may refer to the following places in India:

Mohkhuti No.1
Mohkhuti No.2
Mohkhuti No.3